This is a list of Estonian television related events from 1980.

Events

Debuts
 8. November - television series Maailmapilt debuted. The series was hosted by Mart Siimann.

Television shows

Ending this year

Births
 7 January – Hele Kõrve, actress

Deaths

See also
 1980 in Estonia

References

1980s in Estonian television